"Slave to Love" is the first single released from Roxy Music singer Bryan Ferry's 1985 release, Boys and Girls. The song is one of Ferry's most popular solo hits. The single was released on 28 April 1985 and spent nine weeks in the UK charts in 1985, peaking at number 10. Over two months later he would perform the song at Live Aid in the London concert at Wembley Stadium.

The song features Neil Hubbard and Keith Scott on lead guitar, Dire Straits' Guy Fletcher on keyboards, Omar Hakim on drums, and Tony Levin on bass guitar.

Music video
A promo video directed by Jean-Baptiste Mondino and featuring the Swedish model Christine Bergström, the French model Laurence Treil, the Dutch model Marpessa Hennink, Jillian King, Fabrice Langlade, Olivier Poivre and Richard Teophile was shot to promote the single. The cinematographer was Pascal Lebegue.

Track listings

7"
 "Slave to Love"
 "Valentine" (Instrumental)

12" UK Single: E'G Records / FERRx 1 881873-1
 "Slave to Love" (Special 12" Re-Mix) – 5:56
 "Slave to Love" (Instrumental) – 4:23
 "Valentine" (Instrumental) – 4:00

Charts

Certifications

Use in media

 The song appears in the Miami Vice episode "Junk Love" which aired on November 8, 1985
 The song appears in the film Bitter Moon where Emmanuelle Seigner (Mimi) dances to it with Kristin Scott Thomas (Fiona) at the New Year's Eve Ball scene aboard the cruise ship. 
 The song appears in the film Exit to Eden.
 The song appears in the film Fire with Fire where Virginia Madsen (Lisa) dances to it with Craig Sheffer (Joe)
 The song appears on the soundtrack to the film 9½ Weeks.
 The song was used in series 17 of the BBC Silent Witness, "In a Lonely Place" part 2.
 The song was used in a scene of the TV show Pose, Season 1, Episode 2.
 The song was used in the film Kingsman: The Secret Service.
 The song was used in the film Abduction.
 The song was used in a scene of the TV show Prodigal Son (TV series), Season 2, Episode 9.
The song was used in the show American Horror Story season 4 episode 5
 The song was used in the TV series Legion, season 2 episode 6

References

1985 singles
Bryan Ferry songs
Gwen Stefani songs
Róisín Murphy songs
Songs written by Bryan Ferry
Music videos directed by Jean-Baptiste Mondino
1985 songs
E.G. Records singles